Yaylalar can refer to:

 Yaylalar, Bayburt
 Yaylalar, Çayırlı
 Yaylalar, Lapseki
 Yaylalar, Yusufeli